Matejovce nad Hornádom is a village and municipality in the Spišská Nová Ves District in the Košice Region of central-eastern Slovakia.

History

Geography
In 2011 has a population of 500 inhabitants.

External links
http://en.e-obce.sk/obec/matejovcenadhornadom/matejovce-nad-hornadom.html
https://web.archive.org/web/20080111223415/http://www.statistics.sk/mosmis/eng/run.html
https://web.archive.org/web/20100927065017/http://www.matejovcenadhornadom.ocu.sk/

Villages and municipalities in Spišská Nová Ves District